Durnian (also Romanized as Dūrnīān and Dūrneyān; also known as Darnīān and Darniyan) is a village in Kharqan Rural District, in the Central District of Razan County, Hamadan Province, Iran. At the 2006 census, its population was 349, in 76 families.

References 

Populated places in Razan County